Illinois Route 108 is an east–west highway in western Illinois. Its western terminus is at Illinois Route 100 in Kampsville, and its eastern terminus is at Interstate 55 in Zanesville Township near Raymond.

Route description 

Illinois 108 is a two-lane undivided surface road for its entire length. In Kampsville, the Kampsville ferry operates across the Illinois River and connects the Kampsville segment of Illinois 108 with its remainder. The ferry is free and runs 24 hours a day, seven days a week. It is one of two permanent ferries still operated by the Illinois Department of Transportation; the other is located in Grafton near the intersection of Illinois 100 and Illinois Route 3.

History 
SBI Route 108 was established in 1924. Its routing has not changed since its establishment.

Major intersections

References

External links

 Illinois Highway Ends: Illinois Route 108

108
Transportation in Calhoun County, Illinois
Transportation in Greene County, Illinois
Transportation in Macoupin County, Illinois
Transportation in Montgomery County, Illinois